The 2021 Valour FC season was the third season in the club's history, as well as the third season in Canadian Premier League history.

Overview 
Due to the Covid-19 pandemic, the 2021 Canadian Premier League season began in a bubble in Winnipeg, giving Valour FC home field advantage for the first 8 games of the season. During this time Valour started off strong, reaching the top of the table. Crucial to Valour's success in this stretch was the play of Haitian defender Andrew Jean-Baptiste. Loanee goalkeeper Jonathan Sirois also had a league record-breaking start to the season. However, after playing seven games Jean-Baptiste suffered a season-ending injury. After Jean-Baptiste was injured and the league left the bubble, Valour's season took a sharp downward turn, winning only one match in 10 games. This led to club's only ever head coach, Rob Gale, being fired, and he was replaced with Marc Dos Santos. Under Dos Santos, the team managed to get some better results, and ahead of the last game of the season against bottom of the table FC Edmonton, a playoff spot was within their grasp. The season ended in heartbreak: Edmonton went up three goals to nil, seemingly ending Valour's playoff chances, but in the final fifteen minutes Mosed Dyer scored twice and then Daryl Fordyce scored to equalize things. If Valour scored one more goal they would have made the playoffs, but they could not and finished the season in fifth.

Current squad
As of June 26, 2021.

Transfers

In

Transferred in

Loans in

Draft picks 
Valour FC selected the following players in the 2021 CPL–U Sports Draft on January 29, 2021. Draft picks are not automatically signed to the team roster. Only those who are signed to a contract will be listed as transfers in.

Out

Transferred out

Loans out

Competitions

Canadian Premier League

Table

Results by match

Matches

Canadian Championship

Preliminary Round

Quarter-final

Statistics

Players

Goalkeepers

References

External links 
Official Site

2021
2021 Canadian Premier League
Canadian soccer clubs 2021 season